Luddington may refer to:

Places 
Luddington, Lincolnshire, England
Luddington-in-the-Brook, Northamptonshire, England
Luddington, Warwickshire, England

People
Camilla Luddington, British-American actress
Sir Donald Luddington (1920–2009), British colonial government official and civil servant
Elam Luddington (1806–1893), the first missionary of The Church of Jesus Christ of Latter-day Saints to preach in Thailand
Henry Luddington (1854–1922), English cricketer
William Luddington (1843–1888), Primitive Methodist missionary

Other 
Luddington railway station, Lincolnshire